Hakea aenigma, commonly known as the enigma hakea, is a shrub in the family Proteaceae native to South Australia. Only one of two Hakea species totally reliant on suckering to reproduce therefore have "reached evolutionary dead-ends".

Description
Smaller branches are densely covered with flattened fine hairs, thinning nearer flowering time. Each inflorescence has 16-33 flowers growing on an individual stalk. Pedicels and perianth are cream-white and smooth. Flowers are sterile so no fruit is produced and plants can only reproduce vegetatively by suckering roots. Hakea pulvinifera is  the only other species reliant on this method for reproduction. Hakea aenigma has cream-white blooms throughout spring from September to November.

Taxonomy
Hakea aenigma was first formally described by the botanists Laurence Arnold Haegi and William Robert Barker in 1985 and the description was published in the Journal of the Adelaide Botanic Gardens.
The specific epithet is taken from the Latin word aenigma meaning "riddle", "something obscure" or "inexplicable"  referring to the puzzlement of finding no fruit for the plant and the uncertainty of its origins.

Distribution
This species is endemic to a small area on the western end of Kangaroo Island in South Australia confined to the more elevated parts of the lateritic and is part of the dense mallee-heath that grows in clay-loam to sandy soils.

References

aenigma
Flora of South Australia
Plants described in 1985
Taxa named by William Robert Barker